Youth of the Big City (German: Grosstadtjugend) is a 1929 German silent drama film directed by Rudolf Walther-Fein and starring Harry Liedtke, Ida Wüst and Maria Paudler.

The film's sets were designed by the art directors Botho Hoefer and Hans Minzloff.

Cast
 Harry Liedtke as Dr. phil. Axel v. Rohdenbeck  
 Ida Wüst as Frau Emma Lüders  
 Maria Paudler as Magda Lüders, ihre Tochter  
 Helmut Gauer as Hans Lüders, ihr Sohn  
 Gustav Rickelt as Otto Gericke, Margarine en gros  
 Trude Lehmann as Ottilie Gericke, seine Gattin  
 Alex Sascha as Graf Tomasini  
 Carl Auen as Armin Eggebrecht  
 Hermann Picha as Kunibert Wespe, Detektiv  
 Hilde Auen as Elli  
 Wilhelm Diegelmann as Der Wirt  
 Sylvia Torf as Die Wirtin 
 Max Maximilian as 1. Strolch  
 Alfred Loretto as 2. Strolch

References

Bibliography
 Grange, William. Cultural Chronicle of the Weimar Republic. Scarecrow Press, 2008.

External links

1929 films
Films of the Weimar Republic
Films directed by Rudolf Walther-Fein
German silent feature films
German black-and-white films
German drama films
1929 drama films
Silent drama films
1920s German films
1920s German-language films